Marriage of a Thousand Lies is a novel by Sri Lankan-American author SJ Sindu, published by Soho Press in 2017. It tells the story of Lucky and Kris, two gay South Asian-Americans whose parents immigrated from Sri Lanka, who marry to stay in the closet. 

The novel won the 2018 Publishing Triangle Edmund White Award for Debut Fiction and was a Lambda Literary Award for Lesbian Fiction finalist and Stonewall Honor Book.

Reception 
Marriage of a Thousand Lies received positive reviews from Booklist, Lambda Literary Foundation, Publishers Weekly, Toronto Star, Ms., Paste, Los Angeles Review of Books, International Examiner, and Autostraddle.

References 

Sri Lankan novels
Novels with lesbian themes
2017 American novels
2017 LGBT-related literary works
2010s LGBT novels
LGBT in Sri Lanka
2017 debut novels
Soho Press books